Dirty Girl is a 2010 American coming-of-age comedy-drama film written and directed by Abe Sylvia. It stars Juno Temple, Milla Jovovich, and William H. Macy. The film premiered at the 2010 Toronto International Film Festival on September 12, 2010. It received a limited theatrical release in the United States on October 7, 2011, by The Weinstein Company.

Plot
In 1987 in suburban Oklahoma City, Danielle Edmondston is a troubled and promiscuous high school student. She argues with her mother, Sue-Ann, who is about to marry a Mormon, Ray, and feels out of place in her very conservative small suburban town. Amidst the chaos, she befriends Clarke Walters, a shy, gay classmate. Together, they flee in a car owned by Clarke's homophobic father, Joseph, and embark on a road trip to Fresno, California, where Danielle expects to find her birth father, Danny Briggs. Meanwhile, Sue-Ann and Clarke's mother, Peggy, chase after them.

Joseph breaks into Danielle's house in an attempt to find Clarke, only to find that the entire family has gone on vacation. Joseph is then arrested for breaking into the house. He calls Peggy to bail him out, but Peggy refuses to let him out and insists that she will no longer allow him to harm Clarke for being gay. Joseph, aggravated, has to stay in the cell until a judge can see him.

On the way, Danielle and Clarke pick up a hitchhiker named Joel, who after they stop for rest, has sex with Clarke. Clarke awakens the next morning to find that he is gone, leaving him heartbroken. Clarke blames Danielle for this. After seemingly moving on and returning to the car, it breaks down on the side of the road. Clarke and Danielle continue on foot, trying to rent a car, only to find Joseph has been released from prison and has reported their credit card stolen. Desperate for money, the two enter a bar and Danielle enters a stripping contest. After she is booed profusely, Clarke realizes that it is a biker gay bar. Danielle tells him he must strip instead.

Clarke is cheered as he dances, but is caught by Joseph who enters during this. Danielle collects the prize money, but they are both taken in Joseph's other car. Clarke provokes his father into pulling the car over to attack him, while he tells Danielle to flee. Danielle manages to make it to a bus station, upset having to had to leave Clarke behind. She finds her father's house, where she is met by her mother, who asks her to leave. Danielle manages to make it to her father, who kindly rejects her, revealing he has a young daughter.

Sad, Danielle returns home and visits Clarke's mother, who tells her that Clarke's father has sent him to military school and has moved into an apartment. Danielle enters the talent show and sings "Don't Cry Out Loud" by Melissa Manchester, who is Clarke's favorite singer. As she breaks down singing, Clarke enters dressed in a military uniform. They finish the song together and get into Danielle's car. Clarke reveals that his mother let him out early and that, in an all-boys school, he became very popular, with some sexual implications, at the same school Clarke also learned how to better defend himself against his abusive father, who his mother finally decided to divorce after getting fed up his cruel and controlling behavior. Danielle, with a less rebellious attitude, and Clarke, now no longer afraid to be himself, drive off into the sunset.

Cast

Production
Abe Sylvia developed the story in 2004 while attending UCLA. Sylvia describes it as a fictional account of “growing up in the 1980s” that draws upon some of his adolescent experiences in Oklahoma.

Sally Hawkins and Lisa Kudrow were originally cast in late 2009. Jovovich subsequently replaced Hawkins in the role of Sue-Ann, and Mary Steenburgen replaced Kudrow in the role of Peggy.

Filming began in Southern California in 2010 and was completed in Los Angeles in May 2010.

Reception
Dirty Girl received mostly negative critical reviews, with a "Rotten" rating of 34% at the review aggregator website Rotten Tomatoes, based on 41 reviews. In the New York Times, A.O. Scott declared that he found himself cheering not for the main characters on their road trip, but for the actors Temple and Dozier who were doing their best to salvage a chaotic script that "has far less insight, and much less panache, than a randomly chosen episode of Glee."

The film underperformed at the box-office, earning only $55,125 against an estimated budget of $4 million, due to a limited release.

References

External links
 
 
 
 
 
 IONCINEMA.com TIFF 2010 Viral: Abe Sylvia's Dirty Girl

2010 films
2010 comedy-drama films
2010 independent films
2010 LGBT-related films
2010s coming-of-age comedy-drama films
2010s road comedy-drama films
2010s teen comedy-drama films
American coming-of-age comedy-drama films
American road comedy-drama films
American independent films
American teen comedy-drama films
American teen LGBT-related films
Films about runaways
Films set in 1987
Films set in Oklahoma
Films shot in Los Angeles County, California
Gay-related films
LGBT-related comedy-drama films
LGBT-related coming-of-age films
2010s English-language films
2010s American films